Bolwoningen is a Dutch community in Den Bosch, Netherlands. It consists of 50 spherical houses grouped together with winding paths between them, and next to a canal.

History

Design
Each Bolwoning (literally 'bulb house', or 'ball house') is constructed with reinforced concrete and fiberglass. Each house has three main levels, with storage in bottom. The first, bottom level is the bedroom, the second, middle is the bathroom, and the third, top floor is the living space.

The top space features unique round windows that offer panoramic views.

The houses have been continuously occupied since the community was first constructed.

References

External links
 The Bolwoningen By Dries Kreijkamp: An article in iGNANT Magazine by Paula Lou Riebschläger.
 Suburban Balls: An article in Uncube Magazine by Anneke Bokern
 AD Classics: Bolwoning / Dries Kreijkamp: An article on the website ArchDaily by Gili Merin.
 Bubblemania: A website dedicated to round architecture.

Architecture in the Netherlands
's-Hertogenbosch
Buildings and structures in 's-Hertogenbosch